Water polo events were contested at the 1997 Summer Universiade in the island of Sicily, Italy.

References
 Universiade water polo medalists on HickokSports

1997 Summer Universiade
Universiade
1997
1997